Manjaguni is a village in Ankola taluk, Uttara Kannada district, Karnataka state, India.

Villages in Uttara Kannada district